Louis-Georges Mulot (14 September 1792, Épinay-sur-Seine - 11 April 1872, Paris) was a French engineer and entrepreneur.

Biography 
His father was a locksmith; originally from Vaubexy. After inheriting his father's tools, he proved to be very skillful with his hands; mending shotguns and clocks as well as locks. He also invented a device to improve the process of grating potatoes into potato starch and repaired a steamboat that had been stranded on the Seine. 

In 1823, he was called to Enghien-les-Bains to repair the tools of workers who were digging an artesian well. He watched them at work and learned the process. Upon returning home, he created his own tools and dug his first well on the property of the Marquise de Grollier, an artist who specialized in flower painting. He then dug similar wells in Tours, Elbeuf and Saint-Gratien.

After seven years, drilling to 548 meters (1,798 feet), he struck water. He went on to create more wells throughout France and Algeria. The one at Grenelle went dry only recently. 

While searching for drilling locations in Dourges and Hénin-Beaumont, he discovered the first indication that coal fields existed beyond Douai. This was initially kept secret. At the end of 1848, he and other interested parties applied for a concession.

A decree in August of 1852 established a concession of 3,787 hectares (app. 9,358 acres) in the environs of Dourges, followed shortly by the creation of the Compagnie des mines de Dourges.

Capitalizing on this success, he began engineering large structures, with a cement drilling and pouring technique of his won devising. He also participated in the construction of some railways. He was named Knight in the Legion of Honor by King Louis-Philippe I and obtained a lifetime annuity of 3,000 Francs.

References

Further reading 
 Pierre Hyacinthe Azaïs, Explication et histoire du puits de Grenelle, 1854
 Charles Peligot Laboulaye, Bulletin de la société d'encouragement pour l'industrie nationale, Obituary of Louis-Georges Mulot, 1873
 Guy Dubois, Jean-Marie Minot, Histoire des Mines du Nord et du Pas-de-Calais, Des origines à 1939-45, 1991

External links 

 "Le puits artésien de Grenelle"  
 "Le puits artésien de Grenelle fête ses 150 ans" 
 "Les eaux de la ville lumière - Le puits de Grenelle" 

1792 births
1872 deaths
French engineers
French hydrologists
French mining businesspeople
People from Épinay-sur-Seine